The Nagle Baronetcy, of Jamestown in the County of Westmeath, was a title in the Baronetage of the United Kingdom. It was created on 4 January 1813 for Richard Nagle. The second Baronet was member of parliament for Westmeath. The title became extinct on his death in 1850.

Nagle baronets, of Jamestown (1813)

Sir Richard Nagle, 1st Baronet (died 1827)
Sir Richard Nagle, 2nd Baronet (1800–1850)

References

Extinct baronetcies in the Baronetage of the United Kingdom